Basic Rights: Subsistence, Affluence, and U.S. Foreign Policy is a book by Henry Shue in which he examines the issue of human rights and its relation to U.S. foreign policy.

Reception
Thomas Pogge, Michael Payne, and Andrew Cohen criticized Shue's ideas on basic rights. 
Jordan Kiper provided a defense of Shue's arguments for basic rights.

References

External links 
 Basic Rights: Subsistence, Affluence, and U.S. Foreign Policy

1980 non-fiction books
1996 non-fiction books
Princeton University Press books
Books about human rights
United States foreign policy
Ethics books